Anarsia silvosa is a moth in the family Gelechiidae. It was described by Ueda in 1997. It is found in Japan (Honshu, Kyushu).

The length of the forewings is 6.6-7.5 mm for males and 7.3 mm for females. The forewings are whitish grey, scattered with pale brownish grey and blackish scales. The hindwings are brownish grey scattered with fuscous.

References

silvosa
Moths described in 1997
Moths of Japan